Sarah Hall may refer to:

 Sarah Hall (glass artist) (born 1951), Canadian stained glass artist
 Sarah Hall (writer) (born 1974), English author
Sarah Hall (born 1972)  British journalist, best known as a novelist under the name Sarah Vaughan (writer)
 Sarah Hall Boardman (1803–1845), American born missionary who spent 20 years in Burma
 Sarah Ladd (1860–1927), née Hall, American pictorial and landscape photographer
 Sarah Ewing Hall (1761–1830), American educator, poet, and essayist of Christian literature
 Sara Hall (born 1983), American distance runner